The 1971 Long Beach State 49ers football team represented California State College, Long Beach during the 1971 NCAA College Division football season.

Cal State Long Beach competed in the Pacific Coast Athletic Association. The team was led by third year head coach Jim Stangeland, and played the majority of their home games at Veterans Stadium adjacent to the campus of Long Beach City College in Long Beach, California. One home game was played at Anaheim Stadium in Anaheim, California. They finished the season as Champions of the PCAA, with a record of eight wins and four losses (8–4, 5–1 PCAA).

Schedule

Team players in the NFL
The following were selected in the 1972 NFL Draft.

The following finished their college career in 1970, were not drafted, but played in the NFL.

Notes

References

Long Beach State
Long Beach State 49ers football seasons
Big West Conference football champion seasons
Long Beach State 49ers football